Perro is a genus of dwarf spiders that was first described by A. V. Tanasevitch in 1992.

Species
 it contains five species, found in Russia and Canada:
Perro camtschadalica (Kulczyński, 1885) – Russia
Perro polaris (Eskov, 1986) – Russia, Canada
Perro putoranica (Eskov, 1986) – Russia
Perro subtilipes (Tanasevitch, 1985) (type) – Russia
Perro tshuktshorum (Eskov & Marusik, 1991) – Russia

See also
 List of Linyphiidae species (I–P)

References

Araneomorphae genera
Linyphiidae
Spiders of North America
Spiders of Russia